ADATS may refer to:
Air Defense Artillery Threat Simulators
Air Defense Anti-Tank System
Australian Defence Air Traffic System